The Great Alpine Road (B500) is a country tourist road in Victoria, Australia, running from Wangaratta in the north to Bairnsdale in the east, and passing through the Victorian Alps. The road was given its current name because it was considered the mountain equivalent to Victoria's world-famous Great Ocean Road in the south-west of the state. The road usually remains open during winter; however, vehicles travelling between Harrietville and Omeo are required to carry diamond-pattern snow chains during the declared snow season.

Route
The Great Alpine Road links Victoria's North East with Gippsland, winding through mountains, valleys and forests, and past rivers, vineyards and farms. The section over Mount Hotham rises to an altitude of  AMSL. It is blanketed with snow during winter months and must be cleared on a daily basis. Extreme weather conditions can sometimes still result in the road being closed between Harrietville and Omeo.

The road itself has existed since colonial times in some form, but was unsealed for much of its history; its last portions were sealed between Slatey Cutting and Dinner Plain in the 1996-97 financial year (when the road was renamed the Great Alpine Road), and the 12km between Dinner Plain and Horsehair Plain in the 1997-98 financial year.

History
In 1923 the Country Roads Board (CRB) took responsibility for the Alpine Road between [Harrietville and Omeo, and appointed William Benjamin (Bill) Spargo (1888–1959) as supervisor. He lived in a stone cottage at Hotham Heights, which the CRB expanded, at his request, to accommodate up to twenty visiting skiers. From 1925 the premises operated as a guest-house, Hotham Cottage (Hotham Heights Chalet). This was the forerunner of the Hotham Alpine Resort.

The passing of the Highways and Vehicles Act of 1924 through the Parliament of Victoria provided for the declaration of State Highways, roads two-thirds financed by the State government through the CRB. The Ovens Highway was declared a State Highway within Victoria in the 1947/48 financial year, from Wangaratta via Myrtleford to Bright (for a total of 47.5 miles); before this declaration, the road was referred to as (The) Alpine Road. The highway was eventually extended from Bright further along Alpine Road to Harrietville in September 1993.

The Ovens Highway, and the remainder of Alpine Road beyond, was signed as State Route 156 between Wangaratta and Omeo in 1986. With Victoria's conversion to the newer alphanumeric system in the late 1990s, its former route number was replaced with route B500 in late 1996, with the Ovens Highway and Alpine Road from Wangaratta to Omeo, and the southern section of the Omeo Highway from Omeo to Bruthen and then to Bairnsdale, renamed the Great Alpine Road at the same time.

The passing of the Road Management Act 2004 granted the responsibility of overall management and development of Victoria's major arterial roads to VicRoads: in 2004, VicRoads re-declared the road as Great Alpine Road (Arterial #4005), beginning at Wangaratta Road at Wangaratta and ending at Princes Highway in Bairnsdale.

Gallery of some notable sights

Major intersections, towns and resorts

See also

 Highways in Australia
 Highways in Victoria

References

External links

Highways in Victoria (Australia)
East Gippsland